Nyron Sultan Asgarali (28 December 1920 – 5 November 2006) was a former West Indian international cricketer who played in two Test matches in 1957.

Asgarali was a right-handed opening batsman and an occasional medium-paced bowler whose first-class cricket career lasted more than 20 years, but included only 50 matches, 21 of them on the 1957 West Indies tour of England. Apart from 1957, he never played more than three first-class matches in any single season.

Asgarali was 30 before he made a first-class century, but then made several in inter-island and other matches for Trinidad and Tobago. He also spent several years playing Lancashire League cricket and his knowledge of English conditions was probably a contributory factor in his selection for the 1957 tour. The tour marked the transition between the early 1950s batting dominance of the Three Ws (Everton Weekes, Clyde Walcott and Frank Worrell) and the emergence of new talent in Garfield Sobers, Rohan Kanhai and Collie Smith, and Asgarali was seen as a back-up rather than a front-line batsman. But consistent scoring in county games, plus unexpected defeat in the first Test at Edgbaston, led to him being called up for the second match at Lord's. He made a first-innings duck, and, batting at No 4, a second-innings 26, and was then dropped. Recalled for the final Test at The Oval, he made his highest Test score of 29 out of a total of 89 – Worrell was dismissed early, but Asgarali and Sobers, who made 39, took the score to 68 before the second wicket fell, so the last nine wickets fell for just 21 runs.

On the 1957 tour as a whole, Asgarali made 1,011 runs at an average just below 30.

Asgarali made no further Test appearances, though he played in first-class games in Trinidad into his 40s. His son, Gregory, was also a first-class cricketer for Trinidad and Tobago.

External links 

1920 births
2006 deaths
West Indies Test cricketers
Trinidad and Tobago cricketers
South Trinidad cricketers
Commonwealth XI cricketers
Trinidad and Tobago expatriates in the United Kingdom